This is a list of women artists who were born in Israel or whose artworks are closely associated with that country.

A
Lili Almog (born 1961), Israeli-American photographer, images of nuns
Ella Amitay Sadovsky (born 1964), multidisciplinary artist 
Einat Arif-Galanti (born 1975), visual artist, known for photographic and video works
Maya Attoun (born 1974), contemporary artist

B
Yael Bartana (born 1970), videography
Tatiana Belokonenko (active since the 2000s), Ukrainian-Israeli painter
Tamy Ben-Tor (born 1975), visual artist
Genia Berger (1907–2000), painter, scenographer, ceramist
Esther Berlin-Joel (1895–1972), painter, graphic designer

C
Rhea Carmi (born 1942), Israeli-American mixed-media artist
Mirit Cohen (born 1945-1990), Russian-born Israeli artist
Michal Cole (born 1974), textile artist
Keren Cytter (born 1977), visual artist, writer

G
Tamar Getter (born 1953), painter, educator
Batia Grossbard (1910–1995), Polish-born Israeli painter
Liselotte Grschebina (1908–1994), German-born Israeli photographer

H
Shlomit Haber-Schaim (born 1926), sculptor
Hedva Harechavi (born 1941), poet, artist
Michal Heiman (born 1954), artist, photographer, educator
Michal Helfman (born 1973), multidisciplinary artist

K
Liliane Klapisch (born 1933), painter
Naomie Kremer (born 1953), painter and video artist
Heddy Kun (born 1936), painter

L
Sigalit Landau (born 1969), sculptor, installation artist
Naomi Leshem (born 1963), Israeli artist-photographer
Maya Cohen Levy (born 1955), painter, sculptor
Pamela Levy (1949–2004), American-born Israeli textile artist, painter
Batia Lishansky (1900–1922), Ukrainian-born sculptor
Hila Lulu Lin (born 1964), painter

N
Michal Na'aman (born 1951), painter
Shuli Nachshon (born 1951), Moroccan-born Israeli video and installation artist
Lea Nikel (born 1918), abstract artist

M
Judith Margolis (born 1944), visual artist
Lilah Markman (born 1971), contemporary artist, sculptor

O
Aliza Olmert (born 1946), artist, photographer, writer
Chana Orloff (1888–1968), sculptor
Batya Ouziel (1934–2018), handicrafter

P
Felice Pazner Malkin (born 1929), painter, poster designer
Nira Pereg (born 1969), contemporary artist
Tanya Preminger (active since the 1990s), sculptor

R
Ilana Raviv (born 1945), multidisciplinary artist
Michal Rovner (born 1957), video artist
Zahara Rubin (born 1932), sculptor, painter

S
Yehudit Sasportas (born 1969), installation artist
Zahara Schatz (1916–1999), artistic designer
Ruth Schloss (1922–2013), painter
Deganit Stern Schocken (born 1947), jewellery designer
Hagit Shahal (born 1950), painter
Michal Shalev, book illustrator
Ahuva Sherman (born 1926), painter, textile artist
Siona Shimshi (born 1939), sculptor, ceramist, textile designer
Merav Shinn Ben-Alon (born 1965), multidisciplinary artist
Malka Spigel, musician and visual artist

T
Roni Taharlev (born 1964), painter
Anna Ticho (1894–1980), artist specializing in drawing

U
Aviva Uri (1922–1989), painter

W
Yocheved Weinfeld (born 1947), exhibition designer, educator
Nurit Wilde, photographer
Grete Wolf Krakauer (1890–1970), painter

Y
Hannah Yakin (born 1933), etcher, illustrator, writer
Daniela Yaniv-Richter (born 1956), ceramist, sculptor
Nurit Yarden (born 1959), fine art photographer

Z
Maya Zack (born 1976), contemporary artist

References

-
Israeli women artists, List of
Women artists, List of Israeli
Artists